Marvel Snap is a digital collectible card game developed by Second Dinner and published by Nuverse for Microsoft Windows, macOS, Android and iOS. The game features a collection of different characters from the Marvel Universe. The game was released on October 18, 2022, after a period of beta testing.

Gameplay 
Players each have a deck of 12 cards. Each card depicts a Marvel character with cost, power level, and potentially a special ability. At the start of each round, players simultaneously put one card or more face down on one of three locations. Locations are randomly assigned for each match, and each location has a unique effect. At the end of each round cards are revealed and special abilities of cards trigger. Whoever has the highest power at a given location wins that location. The goal of the game is to win two out of the three locations. The game usually lasts six rounds, each of them giving an increasing "energy" to play more powerful cards.

Players climb the game's ranked ladder by earning "cubes". A game begins with a single cube as its stakes, but a player may double the stakes at any time by "snapping", at which point their opponent has the option of retreating or acceding to the snap. Designer Kent-Erik Hagman compared the mechanic to the doubling cube of the traditional boardgame Backgammon.

The gameplay of Marvel Snap is considered relatively simple compared to other collectible card games, and individual games typically last a few minutes.

At the time of the global release the game featured over 170 characters, with the number increasing weekly.

Monetization 
The game follows a free-to-play-model featuring microtransactions for the purchase of cosmetic skins and a battle pass. The game's beta release included Nexus event with loot boxes to acquire certain cards or in-game cosmetics, allowing players to gamble for new cards and skins with in-game currency or real money, which sparked controversy among the player base and was called out as predatory by video game journalists. Nexus event and its loot boxes were ultimately removed from the game, and in a later patch gold was refunded to anyone who bought loot boxes. The current system allows players to buy a premium currency and exchange it for cosmetic skins, in-game currency, or various rotating bundles.

Development 
Marvel Snap is the debut game from game company Second Dinner, a game development studio founded by former Hearthstone developers Ben Brode, Yong Woo and Hamilton Chu. On January 31, 2023, Second Dinner added Battle Mode to Marvel Snap, which allows for private games with friends.

The promotional trailer for the game features Samuel L. Jackson reprising his role as Nick Fury, returning to S.H.I.E.L.D. to discover that he was informally fired and replaced with a nerdy, teenage girl.

Reception 

According to the review aggregator website Metacritic, Marvel Snap has received "generally favorable reviews".

In a review, GamesRadar+ noted the game is angled towards "a generation of players too distracted to keep track of an overly complicated metagame," while praising its approachability and replay value.

Accolades

References

External links 

2022 video games
Digital collectible card games
Android (operating system) games
IOS games
Windows games
Early access video games
Video games based on Marvel Comics
The Game Awards winners
Interactive Achievement Award winners